Rangiuru is a rural community in the Bay of Plenty of New Zealand's North Island.

Demographics
Rangiuru community is in two SA1 statistical areas which cover . The SA1 areas are part of the Rangiuru statistical area.

Rangiuru community had a population of 261 at the 2018 New Zealand census, a decrease of 18 people (−6.5%) since the 2013 census, and a decrease of 6 people (−2.2%) since the 2006 census. There were 105 households, comprising 132 males and 129 females, giving a sex ratio of 1.02 males per female, with 57 people (21.8%) aged under 15 years, 45 (17.2%) aged 15 to 29, 123 (47.1%) aged 30 to 64, and 42 (16.1%) aged 65 or older.

Ethnicities were 88.5% European/Pākehā, 11.5% Māori, 3.4% Pacific peoples, 8.0% Asian, and 2.3% other ethnicities. People may identify with more than one ethnicity.

Although some people chose not to answer the census's question about religious affiliation, 56.3% had no religion, 31.0% were Christian and 6.9% had other religions.

Of those at least 15 years old, 36 (17.6%) people had a bachelor's or higher degree, and 36 (17.6%) people had no formal qualifications. 57 people (27.9%) earned over $70,000 compared to 17.2% nationally. The employment status of those at least 15 was that 120 (58.8%) people were employed full-time, 45 (22.1%) were part-time, and 6 (2.9%) were unemployed.

Rangiuru statistical area

The statistical area had a population of 2,676 at the 2018 New Zealand census, an increase of 261 people (10.8%) since the 2013 census, and an increase of 300 people (12.6%) since the 2006 census. There were 876 households, comprising 1,359 males and 1,317 females, giving a sex ratio of 1.03 males per female. The median age was 36.4 years (compared with 37.4 years nationally), with 543 people (20.3%) aged under 15 years, 609 (22.8%) aged 15 to 29, 1,191 (44.5%) aged 30 to 64, and 330 (12.3%) aged 65 or older.

Ethnicities were 68.9% European/Pākehā, 33.3% Māori, 3.8% Pacific peoples, 8.3% Asian, and 1.6% other ethnicities. People may identify with more than one ethnicity.

The percentage of people born overseas was 15.4, compared with 27.1% nationally.

Although some people chose not to answer the census's question about religious affiliation, 52.8% had no religion, 32.1% were Christian, 2.2% had Māori religious beliefs, 0.8% were Hindu, 0.4% were Buddhist and 4.0% had other religions.

Of those at least 15 years old, 261 (12.2%) people had a bachelor's or higher degree, and 432 (20.3%) people had no formal qualifications. The median income was $33,200, compared with $31,800 nationally. 321 people (15.0%) earned over $70,000 compared to 17.2% nationally. The employment status of those at least 15 was that 1,200 (56.3%) people were employed full-time, 363 (17.0%) were part-time, and 93 (4.4%) were unemployed.

Marae

Rangiuru has three local marae.

Te Matai or Ngāti Kurī Marae and its Tapuika meeting house are affiliated with the Tapuika hapū of Ngāti Kurī.

Te Paamu Marae and Tia meeting house are affiliated with the Tapuika hapū of Ngāti Marukukere.

Tūhourangi Marae and Tūhourangi meeting house are affiliated with Tūhourangi. In October 2020, the Government committed $500,000 from the Provincial Growth Fund to upgrade the marae, and create 50 jobs.

Education

References 

Western Bay of Plenty District
Populated places in the Bay of Plenty Region